Peninsula Athletic League (PAL) is a high school athletic conference in California, part of the CIF Central Coast Section of the California Interscholastic Federation. It comprises 17 high schools generally around San Mateo County, California. There are also nine smaller schools, designated supplemental members, of which four are located in Santa Clara County. The seventeen sports offered are divided into different divisions depending on the strength of the school's program.

Sports
PAL offers contests in seventeen sports throughout the year during three seasons. Some schools do not participate in all sports.

Notes

Members

Basic members
The seventeen basic member schools in the Peninsula Athletic League are drawn from five public school districts: Cabrillo Unified School District (serving Half Moon Bay and the ocean coast of the San Francisco Peninsula), Jefferson Union (serving Brisbane, Colma, Daly City, and Pacifica), San Mateo Union (serving Burlingame, Millbrae, San Bruno, and San Mateo), Sequoia Union (serving Atherton, Belmont, East Palo Alto, Ladera, San Carlos, Menlo Park, Portola Valley, Redwood City, and Woodside), and the South San Francisco Unified School District (serving South San Francisco and portions of Daly City and San Bruno).

Notes

Supplemental schools
The supplemental schools belong to the West Bay Athletic League. Supplemental members are elected by a two-thirds majority vote of principal basic PAL members and participate less than 50% of total sports offerings from PAL.

Notes

References

External links 
 

CIF Central Coast Section